The Grand Prix Sarajevo was a road cycling race held in 2014 and 2015 in Bosnia and Herzegovina. It was part of the UCI Europe Tour, as a category 1.2 race.

Winners

References

UCI Europe Tour races
Recurring sporting events established in 2014
2014 establishments in Bosnia and Herzegovina
Recurring sporting events disestablished in 2015
2015 disestablishments in Bosnia and Herzegovina
Cycle races in Bosnia and Herzegovina
Summer events in Bosnia and Herzegovina